Ural Airlines serves the following destinations:

List

References

Lists of airline destinations